Erickson Lubin (born October 1, 1995) is an American professional boxer who challenged for the WBC super welterweight title in 2017. As of January 2022, he is ranked as the world's fourth best active super welterweight by The Ring magazine seventh by BoxRec, and third by the Transnational Boxing Rankings Board.

Early life and amateur career
Lubin was born to Haitian parents Erick Lubin and Marjorie in Orlando, Florida where he grew up as idolizing Oscar De La Hoya and other boxers. Lubin won the 2013 Golden Gloves as a welterweight. He was expected to qualify for the 2016 Olympics but turned professional instead.

Lubin had a record of 143–7.

Professional career
Lubin made his professional debut in November 2013.

Lubin vs. Cota 
After 17 wins, 12 of them by way of knockout, Lubin faced Jorge Cota in a WBC super welterweight title eliminator. The fight was scheduled for 4 March 2017 as a co-feature to Keith Thurman-Danny García. Cota went down on the fourth round, he would rise but the referee deemed him unable to continue. With the win, Lubin became Jermell Charlo's mandatory challenger.

Lubin vs. Charlo 
On August 24, RingTV announced that the fight between Charlo and Lubin would take place on October 14 at the Barclays Center in Brooklyn, New York. The fight card would also feature Erislandy Lara defending his WBA title against Terrell Gausha and Jarrett Hurd defending his IBF title against Austin Trout, with the event being billed as a super welterweight triple-header. Charlo made swift work of Lubin, knocking him out toward the end of the first round, as Lubin dipped directly into a right uppercut in an attempt to dodge a left jab.

Lubin rebounded from his loss to Charlo with a series of wins.

Lubin vs. Gallimore 
On October 26, 2019, Lubin fought Nathaniel Gallimore and defeated him via unanimous decision, winning 99–91 on all three scorecards.

Lubin vs. Gausha 
On September 19, 2020, he captured the vacant WBC Silver super welterweight title with a 12-round unanimous decision victory against former world title challenger Terrell Gausha, who was ranked #6 by the WBA at super welterweight, winning with scores of 115–113, 116–112, and 118–110.

Lubin vs. Rosario 
On June 26, 2021, Lubin prevailed in a WBC final eliminator against former unified world champion Jeison Rosario with a sixth-round knockout victory. Rosario was ranked #3 by the WBC, #6 by the WBA, #10 by the IBF and #4 by The Ring at super welterweight.

Professional boxing record

References

External links

Erickson Lubin - Profile, News Archive & Current Rankings at Box.Live

1995 births
Living people
Sportspeople from Orlando, Florida
Boxers from Florida
American male boxers
African-American boxers
American sportspeople of Haitian descent
Welterweight boxers
Light-middleweight boxers
National Golden Gloves champions
21st-century African-American sportspeople